Henrik Dam Kristensen (born 31 January 1957 in Vorbasse) is a Danish politician and the current speaker of the Danish parliament. He has been a member of the Danish parliament for the Social Democrats from 1990–2004 and again from 2007, during which he served as Minister for Agriculture and Fisheries (1994–1996), Minister for Food (1996–2000), Minister for Social Affairs (2000–2001), Minister for Transport (2011–2013) and Minister for Employment (2014–2015). He served as President of the Nordic Council in 2011 and 2016.

Background
Kristensen was born in Vorbasse to Ove Dam Kristensen and Gudrun Dam Kristensen. From 1978 to 1986 he worked as a postman in Vorbasse, and also worked with the Danish Refugee Council from 1986 to 1988. From 1988 to 1990 he worked as a principal at a school. He is married to Bente Dam Kristensen.

Political career
Kristenden was first elected to the Folketing in 1990, and reelected in 1994, 1998, and 2001. From 1996 to 2000 he was Minister of Food, until 2000, where he became Minister of Social Affairs. Kristensen ran in the 2004 European Parliament election and was elected as a member of the European Parliament. To perform in his new position, Kristensen resigned his seat in the Folketing. Margot Torp took over his seat. In the European Parliament, Kristensen sat on the European Parliament's Committee on Fisheries, the Committee on the Internal Market and Consumer Protection and the Delegation for Relations with the Countries of South-East Europe.

In 2006 Kristensen resigned his seat from the European Parliament, and the seat was taken over by Christel Schaldemose. He became the party secretary of the Social Democrats. He ran for the Folketing again in the 2007 Danish general election, where he was elected. He was reelected in 2011. On 3 October 2011 Kristensen was appointed to the post of Minister for Transport in the Cabinet of Helle Thorning-Schmidt, and left office on 9 August 2013. On 10 October 2014 he again entered the cabinet, when he was appointed the position of Minister for Employment.

Kristensen was reelected into the Folketing in the 2015 and 2019 elections. On 21 June 2019 Kristensen was appointed speaker of the Danish parliament, replacing Pia Kjærsgaard.

In 2011 Denmark was to appoint a president of the Nordic Council and Kristensen was chosen. He was president again in 2016.

References

External links
 
European Parliament CV
 

 

 
|-

 

1957 births
Living people
People from Billund Municipality
MEPs for Denmark 2004–2009
Social Democrats (Denmark) politicians]
Social Democrats (Denmark) MEPs
Speakers of the Folketing
Government ministers of Denmark
Agriculture ministers of Denmark
Members of the Folketing 1990–1994
Members of the Folketing 1994–1998
Members of the Folketing 1998–2001
Members of the Folketing 2001–2005
Members of the Folketing 2007–2011
Members of the Folketing 2011–2015
Members of the Folketing 2015–2019
Members of the Folketing 2019–2022
Transport ministers of Denmark
Employment ministers of Denmark